First Presbyterian Church is a historic church at 433 Ocoee Street NW in Cleveland, Tennessee. The First Presbyterian congregation is affiliated with the Presbyterian Church (U.S.A.) and the Presbytery of East Tennessee.

The church was built in 1856 and is the oldest extant church building in Cleveland. It was damaged by military activity during the American Civil War; some of the musket balls that were fired into the steeple are still embedded there. It was added to the National Register of Historic Places in 1986.

References

External links
 

Presbyterian churches in Tennessee
Churches on the National Register of Historic Places in Tennessee
Churches completed in 1856
19th-century Presbyterian church buildings in the United States
Churches in Bradley County, Tennessee
Cleveland, Tennessee
National Register of Historic Places in Bradley County, Tennessee